is a passenger railway station located in the city of Kuki, Saitama, Japan, operated jointly by East Japan Railway Company (JR East) and the private railway operator Tobu Railway.

Lines
It is also a station on the JR East Tōhoku Main Line (Utsunomiya Line) and is 57.3 km from the starting point of that line at Tokyo Station. There is a track linking the Tōbu and JR lines, used by the through-running Nikkō and Kinugawa services. The linking track has a pair of small platforms for crew changes, but no passenger facilities.

Station layout

JR East station

The JR East station consists of one island platform and one side platform serving three tracks, connected to the station building by a footbridge. The station has a "Midori no Madoguchi" staffed ticket office.

Tōbu Railway station

The Tōbu Railway station consists of one island platform serving two tracks, with an elevated station building located above the platform.

Platforms

History
The JR East Tōhoku Line (Utsunomiya Line) station opened on 16 July 1885. The Tōbu station opened on 1 April 1929.

From 17 March 2012, station numbering was introduced on all Tōbu lines, with Kurihashi Station becoming "TN-04".

Passenger statistics
In fiscal 2019, the JR East station was used by an average of 12,427 passengers daily (boarding passengers only). In fiscal 2019, the Tobu portion of the station was used by an average of 11,628 passengers daily (boarding passengers only).

Surrounding area
Kurihashi Post Office

See also
 List of railway stations in Japan

References

External links

 Kurihayashi Station information (JR East) 
 Kurihashi Station information (Tobu) 

Railway stations in Saitama Prefecture
Stations of East Japan Railway Company
Stations of Tobu Railway
Railway stations in Japan opened in 1885
Tobu Nikko Line
Tōhoku Main Line
Utsunomiya Line
Kuki, Saitama